In the U.S. state of Virginia, U.S. Route 220 (US 220) is a major north-south state highway that extends from the North Carolina state line through Roanoke to the West Virginia state line. South of Roanoke, US 220 is a four-lane highway within the proposed Interstate 73 (I-73) corridor. US 220 narrows to two lanes north of Roanoke, connecting to I-64 near Clifton Forge and then paralleling the Appalachian Mountains north-northeasterly in the direction of Cumberland, Maryland.

Route description

US 220 enters Virginia just north of the community of Price, North Carolina. In particular, the stretch through Boones Mill is not divided; the town is also well known as a speed trap. This segment follows the same general alignment as the Norfolk Southern Railway's Winston-Salem District, opened in 1892 by the Roanoke and Southern Railway.

US 220 meets the northern terminus of State Route 87 in Ridgeway, and soon after turns west to bypass the city of Martinsville on a freeway partially shared with US 58. Another bypass takes the highway around the town of Rocky Mount, after which US 220 crosses the Blue Ridge at Murray Gap. Soon after entering the city of Roanoke, US 220 intersects SR 419 and again becomes a freeway, this one passing just east of downtown Roanoke and becoming Interstate 581 northwest to Interstate 81.

US 220 overlaps I-81 northeast to near Daleville, where it exits to the north onto a four-lane road through Daleville and Fincastle. Near Eagle Rock, the road narrows to two lanes and begins to parallel the James River. US 220 follows the James River and its major tributary, the Jackson River, north to near Clifton Forge, where it begins to overlap Interstate 64 and US 60 west, still following the Jackson River, to Covington. Also paralleling these rivers are CSX Transportation's Alleghany Subdivision and James River Subdivision, opened in 1867 and 1881 respectively by the Virginia Central Railroad and Richmond and Alleghany Railroad.

US 220 is a two-lane road for the rest of its route from Covington to West Virginia, as it travels through a series of valleys in the Ridge-and-Valley Appalachians. It begins by following more of the Jackson River to near Clearwater Park, but then crosses a ridge into a different valley. This is repeated several times until Forks of Waters, where the South Branch Potomac River enters US 220's valley and parallels its final  to the state line.

History
Part of the Great Wagon Road branched off near what is present day Roanoke, Virginia, and U.S. Route 220 in Virginia now follows part of this section of the Carolina Road. "The route was improved as a stage road in the early years of the republic. In 1838 it was rebuilt to serve the Pittsylvania, Franklin and Botetourt Turnpike, which served to connect south central Virginia with the Valley."

As a U.S. Highway, US 220 was initially part of U.S. Route 311, which split from US 11 at Roanoke and ran south to Aberdeen, North Carolina. This was also part of State Route 33, one of Virginia's original state highways from 1918 (which was numbered 3 until 1923). Other than the US 60 overlap, two other segments date to 1918: part of SR 17 from Covington to Warm Springs, and part of SR 39 (originally 9) from Vanderpool to Monterey.

Otherwise the gaps were filled starting in 1922, with the legislative designation of a spur of SR 14 from Clifton Forge south to Eagle Rock, which was numbered State Route 142 in 1923. 1924 saw the beginning of the extension of SR 142 southwest to US 11 at Troutville, and it was also extended along SR 14 east to Longdale Furnace and then north to Millboro Springs. In 1926 it became part of a realignment of SR 17, with that route's former routing to Covington becoming part of new State Route 338.

The first piece of State Route 395, which ended up extending from Warm Springs to West Virginia, was also created in 1924 as a spur from SR 39 at Monterey. The entire Covington-West Virginia corridor (SR 395 and part of SR 338) became State Route 800 in 1928 (along with an extension southwest from Covington), and was renumbered State Route 18 in 1933. Also in 1933, the part of SR 17 south of Clifton Forge became State Route 12.

US 220 was extended into Virginia in 1935, replacing SR 18 north of Covington, all of SR 12, and all of US 311 in Virginia. US 311 has since been re-extended into the state west of Danville.

The modern US 220 corridor was added to the state highway system as follows:

Major intersections

See also
 Special routes of U.S. Route 220

References

20-2
U.S. Route 220
U.S. Route 220
U.S. Route 220
U.S. Route 220
U.S. Route 220
U.S. Route 220
U.S. Route 220
U.S. Route 220
U.S. Route 220
U.S. Route 220
 Virginia